Dance with the Ancestors is an album by Ethnic Heritage Ensemble, a jazz band formed by percussionist Kahil El'Zabar, who is joined by saxophonist Edward Wilkerson and trombonist Joseph Bowie. It was released in 1993 on the Chameleon label and distributed by Elektra Records.

Reception

The Penguin Guide to Jazz states "Whether marching through 'Take the A Train' or one of their own, somewhat enigmatic, free pieces, the group suggests fresh avenues for Chicago jazz to turn down next."

Track listing
All compositions by Kahil El'Zabar except as indicated
 "Oceans Deep" – 7:51
 "Ornette" – 8:19 
 "Hit Me" (Joseph Bowie) – 4:40
 "Take the 'A' Train" – 3:18
 "Alika Rising" – 7:30
 "Ode to the True Crusaders" – 7:13 
 "Mis-Taken Brilliance" – 3:16
 "Nia" – 6:36
 "Gwenyana" – 7:17
 "Dance with the Ancestors" – 5:30

Personnel
Kahil El'Zabar –  earth drums, sanza, trap drums, percussion, vocals
Edward Wilkerson – tenor sax, alto clarinet, percussion, vocals
Joseph Bowie – trombone, congas, percussion, vocals

References

1993 albums
Kahil El'Zabar albums
Chameleon (label) albums